Azrieli College of Engineering Jerusalem is an Israeli public academic college that trains engineers. It is located in the Ramat Beit HaKerem neighborhood of Jerusalem, between Jerusalem's two major high-tech industrial areas, Har Hotzvim and the Jerusalem Technology Park.

Overview
 
High-tech enterprises in Jerusalem have been warning of a severe shortage of technological manpower. To fill that gap, Azrieli College of Engineering Jerusalem coordinates its academic programs with the local high-tech industry. The college offers undergraduate (Bachelor of Science, B.Sc.) degrees in software engineering, industrial management engineering, electronic engineering, advanced materials engineers, Pharmaceutical engineering (cooperation with TEVA), mechanical engineering, as well as a graduate (Master of Science, M.Sc.) in software engineering and a pre-academic preparatory program to prepare prospective students for acceptance into and success in the college's engineering departments.

History 
Plans to establish the college were announced on December 25, 1996, by Ehud Olmert, then Mayor of Jerusalem, Minister of Education Zevulun Hammer, and Professor Amnon Pazi, then Chairman of the budgeting and planning committee of the council for higher education. Delegates of the Jerusalem Municipality sit on the Board of Governors and the Executive Board.

Joint programs
The college is authorized as the exclusive Jerusalem partner of Technion – Israel Institute of Technology enjoying a partnership in a Civil and Environmental Engineering Track, wherein students study the first two years of the program in Jerusalem, and the second two years at Technion in Haifa.

See also
Education in Israel
List of universities and colleges in Israel
Science and technology in Israel
Practical engineer

References

External links 
JCE Hebrew Homepage

Colleges in Israel
Universities and colleges in Jerusalem
Educational institutions established in 1996
1996 establishments in Israel
Engineering universities and colleges in Israel